Knights Valley AVA is an American Viticultural Area (AVA) in Sonoma County, California. One of Sonoma County's original five AVAs, Knights Valley AVA was formally designated an American Viticultural Area on October 21, 1983. Over 30 growers maintain the  planted to wine grape vineyards. The easternmost designated Sonoma County wine region, Knights Valley AVA has the warmest climate in the county. The valley lies between the Alexander Valley AVA and Chalk Hill AVA wine regions to the west and the Mayacamas Mountains to the east. Geographically, the appellation separates the rest of Sonoma County from the Napa Valley AVA.

History  
Very few people inhabited the valley in 1843 when a  land grant was given to Jose de los Santos Berryessa as a reward from the Mexican Governor for his years of good service. Most of Knights Valley (known as Mallacomes Valley) and Calistoga (Known as Agua Caliente) was within this grant. Knights Valley became Berryessa's private hunting preserve where he built an adobe hunting lodge that remains to this day. In 1850, after the Mexican War, California became part of the United States and most of the Spanish settlers including Berryessa returned to Mexico.

Thomas B. Knight, a participant in the Bear Flag Revolt at Sonoma bought a large portion of Rancho Mallacomes from Berryessa and received title to the land in 1853. He called his rancho, Muristood, added a second story to the lodge and planted vineyards, peaches, apples and wheat. Mallocomes Valley would later be renamed "Knights Valley" after Thomas Knight.

Climate 
Protected from direct Pacific Ocean influence, the valley is the warmest of Sonoma County's viticulture areas. Warm afternoons and cool evenings provide the ideal environment for growing Bordeaux grape varieties. Cabernet Sauvignon remains the star in the valley. Also present are the rest of the Meritage blend: Merlot, Cabernet Franc, Malbec, and Petit Verdot, as well as Sauvignon blanc, Chardonnay, Viognier, Syrah, and some limited plantings of other varietals.

Wineries 
Several wineries produce wine with the Knights Valley AVA designation.  The three largest producers of Knights Valley AVA designated wines are Beringer Vineyards, Kendall Jackson Winery, (under its Highland Estates label), and Bavarian Lion Vineyards.

References

External links
Knights Valley AVA

American Viticultural Areas
American Viticultural Areas of California
American Viticultural Areas of the San Francisco Bay Area
Geography of Sonoma County, California
1983 establishments in California